Philippine Open may refer to several sporting events.

Philippine Open (golf)
Philippines Open (badminton)
Philippines Open (darts)